The preauricular deep parotid lymph nodes (anterior auricular glands or preauricular glands), from one to three in number, lie immediately in front of the tragus.

Their afferents drain multiple surfaces, most of which are lateral in origin.  A specific example would be the lateral portions of the eye's bulbar and palpebral conjunctiva as well as the skin adjacent to the ear within the temporal region.  The efferents of these nodes pass to the superior deep cervical glands.

The preauricular nodes glands will present with marked swelling in viral conjunctivitis.

References

External links
 Image at umich.edu - must rollover bad link
 Diagram at Baylor College of Medicine bad link
 Lymphadenopathy and Malignancy article - American Family Physician journal

Lymphatics of the head and neck